Hansjörg Wirz (born 9 June 1943) is a Swiss sports official and retired hurdler.

As a hurdler he finished fourth at the 1969 European Championships and competed at the 1972 Olympic Games without reaching the final. He became Swiss champion in 1968, 1969 and 1972. His personal best time was 50.78 seconds (1972).

He served as the president of European Athletics from 1999 to 2015.

References

1943 births
Living people
Swiss male hurdlers
Athletes (track and field) at the 1972 Summer Olympics
Olympic athletes of Switzerland
Swiss referees and umpires